Te Retimana Te Korou (?–1882) was a notable New Zealand tribal leader. Of Māori descent, he identified with the Ngāti Kahungunu and Rangitāne iwi.

References

See also
 Historical Maori And Pacific Islands, by Victoria University of Wellington Library

Year of birth missing
1882 deaths
Ngāti Kahungunu people
Rangitāne people